The Wichita Tornado was soccer club based in Wichita, Kansas that competed in the SISL.

Year-by-year

Tornado
Tornado
Defunct indoor soccer clubs in the United States
USISL teams